Superstore is an American comedy television series created by Justin Spitzer, which premiered on NBC on November 30, 2015. The series stars America Ferrera, Ben Feldman, Lauren Ash, Colton Dunn, Nico Santos, Nichole Sakura and Mark McKinney as a group of employees working at a fictional big-box store called "Cloud 9" set in St. Louis, Missouri.

Overview

Main

Amy Sosa

Portrayed by America Ferrera, Amelia "Amy" Dubanowski (née Sosa), is a Cloud 9 employee of eleven years who worked as an associate, then floor supervisor, then is promoted to assistant manager, and very briefly store manager before going on strike in the season one finale. Amy immediately clashes with new associate Jonah, as he strives for change and has a sometimes pretentious attitude that annoys her. Although Amy was accepted to college, she never attended due to getting pregnant and marrying Adam instead, however she is currently enrolled in classes part time while working. Amy appears somewhat jaded, admitting she did not see herself still working at Cloud 9 more than ten years after starting her employment there. She has referred to Halloween as her favorite day of the year.

Amy's parents are Ron and Connie Sosa. At age 19, she married her high school sweetheart, Adam, with whom she has a daughter, Emma. The episode "Cheyenne's Wedding" reveals that Amy and Adam got married after learning that Amy was pregnant.  Adam refers to Amy as "Bean", because when they first got together he thought she looked like a naked bean. Amy was surprised when Glenn referenced her marital issues, and was further surprised when all of the coworkers also suggested they felt she was having issues at home as well. After having a pregnancy scare, Amy realizes she is not happy and starts to question her marriage, admitting she was relieved to find out she wasn't pregnant. Following this incident Amy admits to Glenn that she and Adam decided to separate, though he continues to live in their basement. It was later revealed that they decided to divorce.

In the season 3 episode "Gender Reveal", Amy tells Dina and Cheyenne she is pregnant, the result of a one-night stand she had with Adam when the two were feeling alone and vulnerable. Despite this, she tells Adam in the next episode that she has zero interest in getting back together. In the season 3 finale, Jonah and a pregnant Amy are caught on camera having a sexual encounter in the photo lab.

In the season 4 episode "Costume Competition", Glenn calls her "Amy Sosa", suggesting that Amy has gone back to using her maiden name. This is later confirmed in subsequent episodes. Also in season 4, Amy gives birth to her second child, a son she names Parker. She and Jonah also officially begin dating. In the season 4 episode "Minor Crimes", Amy becomes the store manager after Glenn steps down to spend more time with his family. 

In the season 5 episode "California Part 1", Amy gets offered a corporate job that would require her to move to California. In the season 6 episode "California Part 2" Amy discovers Jonah is going to propose to her, resulting in the two breaking up due to Amy not being ready for marriage. Amy subsequently moves to California to start her new job at Zephra. This storyline was developed due to Ferrera's 2019 announcement that she'd be departing the series at the end of season 5, citing other projects and wanting to spend time with family. Her departure was pushed back to the second episode of season 6 due to season 5 work stoppages resulting from the COVID-19 pandemic.

Amy returns in the penultimate episode "Perfect Store," where she attempts to save the store, and when she fails, she quits her job with corporate. In the show's ending montage, it is revealed that Amy has married Jonah, got another executive job, and they have a son named Carter.

In order to keep strangers from calling her by her real name, Amy wears a different name tag in each episode with the exception of the two episodes where she wore her own assistant manager name tag, and one where she wore no name tag. The name tags she's worn are:

Jonah Simms

Portrayed by Ben Feldman, Jonah Simms is hired along with Mateo in the "Pilot" episode. Jonah is anti-guns and refuses to work the gun counter. Jonah has had issues with gambling addiction.

Jonah can sometimes come off as being "tough," snobby, critical, and like he has everything together. However, he does have some struggles on the job, particularly at first. He improves through his effort and commitment, though, eventually becoming a valuable part of the team. Despite sometimes coming off snobby, he forms working relationships with the other staff. He has a good sense of humor, which, along with his effort and passion, helps make him well-liked. His humor adds a fun feeling to the store atmosphere, sometimes helping to cheer up the others. 

Jonah makes a terrible impression on his first day and immediately clashes with Amy, but their relationship has since improved. Despite their rough start, Jonah has been attracted to Amy since the first time he saw her. He was caught off guard when he found out that Amy has a daughter and is married, as Amy never wears her wedding ring at work.

Jonah is from a well-to-do background and came to Cloud 9 because he dropped out of business school in Chicago and ran up debt. He was driving aimlessly until he stopped at a Cloud 9 in St. Louis and saw the "help wanted" sign. When Jonah left, he put his schooling on deferment, however he inadvertently let the allowable deferment time lapse. 

The Season 3 episode "Viral Video" reveals that Jonah has begun dating new employee Kelly, much to Amy's disappointment. After Amy reveals that she has feelings for Jonah, Jonah subsequently breaks up with Kelly. In the season 4 episode "Back to School" it is revealed that Jonah and Amy are dating. 

Jonah's family is shown to be rather dysfunctional and he often clashes with them. It's revealed in Season 4's "New Initiative" that Jonah's parents think he's in medical school and is dating actress Natalie Portman. they also assume he's the store manager when they discover he’s not in medical school. They are mortified to find out he dropped out of business school and is actually working a minimum wage job as an associate. In the season 5 episode "Customer Safari". Jonah chews out his brother Josh after it's shown he constantly belittles and insults Jonah (and was implied to have done the same throughout their childhood), and suggests that his parents should divorce after his father Richard reveals he had been having an affair (and had cheated on Marilyn once before). Marilyn decides to divorce him at the end of the episode.

Jonah prides himself on being worldly and well-read, and makes every effort to inject this into conversations with coworkers. Garrett maintains a list of "all the crazy white-person stuff" Jonah says, such as: "fencing", "wearing boat shoes", "BBC America", "making his own trail mix", and saying "fine, but I want my objection noted". Jonah mentions in a season 3 episode that one of the prized gifts he got as a child was a boxed CD set of Winston Churchill speeches.

Jonah led a push to unionize the Cloud 9 workers in season 5, resulting him being invited to a meeting with corporate (accompanied by Sandra) after he holds a successful employee vote. After initially being shot down, Jonah is surprised when corporate reps accept his demands. Upon returning to the store with pride, Jonah soon learns that Cloud 9 was just purchased by Zephra, and the new company will not recognize any existing labor agreements. 

In the season 6 episode "California Part 2" Amy discovers Jonah is going to propose to her, resulting in the two breaking up due to Amy not being ready for another marriage. After this, Jonah begins dating Carol's lawyer, Hannah, however the two break up and Jonah gets back together with Amy. In the show's final scene, they have a son, Carter, and Jonah is running for city council.

Dina Fox

Portrayed by Lauren Ash, Dina Fox is Cloud 9's assistant store manager. Although at one point she takes a voluntary demotion, Dina does not participate when her coworkers stage a walkout, and thus reassumes her assistant manager role.

Dina is extremely connected to her pet birds, but out of touch with other people. Her by-the-book management style often clashes with employees, and even her boss, Glenn, when he espouses his religious beliefs in the workplace. Dina has a very abrasive exterior but she also has a soft side. Early in season 2, she blackmails the district manager, Jeff, into shredding his report to corporate which could have resulted in Amy's termination. Although Dina is a vegan, she ate a chicken leg in the season 3 episode "Golden Globes Party" to make Amy feel better about her disastrous barbecue.

Dina also has a very healthy self-confidence, once referring to herself as a "solid 8.25" and the third prettiest girl in ROTC.

Dina takes a voluntary demotion to sales associate to pursue Jonah romantically, after Jonah politely claims that the reason he resists her advances is because she is his supervisor. Jonah later has to admit he has no feelings for her, so Dina turns her romantic interest toward Marcus. Dina later turns her romantic interests toward Garrett, kissing him in the break room after the Black Friday rush. After the incident, Dina tells Garrett that it meant nothing and to just act cool. She later reveals in the episode "Ladies Lunch" that she and Garrett had a sexual encounter that day, but the other female employees laugh at her, thinking it's a joke. When Dina and Garrett are alone in Glenn's office due to the heat in the store, they wind up having sex two more times.

Dina agrees to be a surrogate mother for Glenn and his wife Jerusha in the season 3 episode "High Volume Store". She announces she is pregnant three episodes later. She delivers a girl in the season 4 episode "Delivery Day".

It is revealed that Dina has had a strained relationship with her father, Howard, and has not spoken to him in years. He makes a surprise visit to the store in the season 5 episode "Myrtle" proclaiming to be a changed man, but Dina soon learns that is not true.

In season 5 Dina meets and begins dating Dr. Brian Patterson, a veterinarian she meets while trying to save an injured bird.

In the season 6 episode "The Trough" Garrett and Dina nearly kiss while Garrett tries to help her find "The Trough", a secret spot in the store employees use for breaks. Garrett briefly enters into an open relationship with Dina and Brian but quickly breaks it off due to finding the dynamic weird. In "Lowell Anderson", Dina breaks up with Brian, and ends up taking Garrett out for a "pity dinner".

In the series finale "All Sales Final", Dina reveals she's picked to be a fullfillment center manager after the close of store 1217. It is also revealed she has been seeing Garrett regularly, and they finally agree to become an official couple.

Garrett McNeill

Portrayed by Colton Dunn, Garrett McNeill is a Cloud 9 associate who is paralyzed from the waist down. He frequently works the customer service counter and is often heard making announcements over the store public address system. He enjoys pulling pranks on his coworkers and even customers, usually out of boredom. Garrett likes to make fun of Jonah, but often saves his most scathing criticisms for his supervisor, Dina. By the series finale, Garrett has been working at Cloud 9 for 20 years.

In the episode "Halloween Theft", Dina wears a revealing costume and Garrett can't take his eyes off of her. Dina eventually kisses him in the episode "Black Friday", and Garrett does not try to stop it. Following this incident, Dina tells Garrett that it meant nothing, however Garrett has trouble understanding how to act around her. Dina reveals in the episode "Ladies Lunch" that there was more than a kiss, and she and Garrett had a sexual encounter that day.  When Garrett and Dina are alone in Glenn's office during the episode "Super Hot Store", they wind up having sex two more times.

In the season 5 episode "Forced Hire" Garrett falls for Colleen, Dina's nemesis. They begin dating, forcing Garrett to try to hide the relationship from Dina, but by "Toy Drive" Colleen appears to have ghosted him. In the series finale, Garrett and Dina finally begin a real relationship.

Mateo Liwanag

Portrayed by Nico Santos, Mateo Fernando Aquino Liwanag is a Filipino (mistaken as Mexican) Cloud 9 associate. He is an employee who wants to climb the ladder at Cloud 9 as quickly as possible. He immediately begins a rivalry with Jonah, who was hired at the same time as him, by pointing out his mistakes, and later admits to being overly competitive (which was already obvious). He has mentioned that he lives with his cousins.

Mateo discovers he is an undocumented worker, though Glenn is oblivious when Mateo tries to confess. Mateo later confesses to Cheyenne as well. In an attempt to keep his secret, Mateo buys Garrett's "I voted" sticker from him, so it would appear that he voted and no one would question his citizenship.

He came out as gay to Glenn, while helping a gay couple find lights for their wedding. Mateo gets asked out by district manager Jeff, which he is very excited about, however the longer they need to keep it a secret the harder he finds it. After Amy catches them at the movie, Jeff admits at a meeting that they have been dating. After Mateo and Jeff's relationship becomes public, Mateo must transfer out of Jeff's district, however when told to present his social security card as is necessary for the transfer, he breaks up with Jeff rather than admitting his documents are fake. In the sixth season, Mateo begins dating Amy's brother Eric, and they get married years later.

After Cloud 9 closes, Mateo, along with Cheyenne, are working at Sturgis & Sons.

Cheyenne Lee

Portrayed by Nichole Sakura, Cheyenne Tyler Thompson (née Lee) is a Cloud 9 associate who is a pregnant 17-year-old high school student at the start of the series. She frequently works at the cosmetics counter. Cheyenne becomes engaged to her immature boyfriend and father of her daughter, Derek "Bo" Thompson. Prior to dating Bo, Cheyenne dated her sophomore English teacher, Cole. She delivers a baby girl named Harmonica, in the store. The employees threaten to unionize when Cheyenne is unable to get paid maternity leave, leading to Glenn being fired for suspending her six weeks with pay, resulting in a strike. Cheyenne once contemplated dropping out of school in order to try and become an Olympic athlete. As of the episode "Cheyenne's Wedding", she and Bo are married. The season 3 episode "Target" reveals that Cheyenne is also working part-time at a Target store.

In the season 6 episode "Floor Supervisor", Cheyenne is promoted to the floor supervisor position that was vacated by Glenn. After Cloud 9 closes, Cheyenne takes a job at Sturgis & Sons.

Glenn Sturgis

Portrayed by Mark McKinney, Glenn Phillip Sturgis is Cloud 9's store manager. Glenn is socially awkward and constantly positive, and he clashes with Dina when he brings his Christian religious beliefs into the workplace. Glenn was shocked to learn that the Cloud 9 pharmacy sells the morning after pill, so he tried to purchase all the pills in the store, at US$40 each, to ensure customers could not.

Until Season 4, Glenn and his wife, Jerusha, had no children of their own, but they had been foster parents to eleven kids. His parents were Arthur and Marion Sturgis. His family owned a hardware store, Sturgis and Sons, before Cloud 9 put them out of business after 59 years. This made Glenn a family "black sheep" when he took the Cloud 9 job. Glenn met Jerusha while she was working at Sturgis and Sons, and although he asked her out every day, she repeatedly said no, until Glenn's father threatened to fire her if she did not agree to go out with him.

Glenn's compassion is abundant and for everyone, whether they've been good or bad to him. Due to the fact that Cloud 9 does not provide paid maternity leave, Glenn faked anger with Cheyenne and suspended her for six weeks with pay, and a person from corporate overheard this and got Glenn fired. When Dina made a mistake and a customer demanded she be fired, Glenn devised a plan to hide store merchandise on the customer, so that the sensors would go off when the woman left. Glenn then offered to look the other way on the "theft" if the customer would ignore Dina's error.

Glenn reveals in the Season 2 episode "Super Hot Store" that he is 57 years old. A running gag on the series is Glenn's Volvo frequently getting smashed by something as it sits in the store parking lot.

Glenn and his wife Jerusha hire Dina to be their surrogate in Season 4. Dina eventually delivers the couple's daughter. In the Season 4 episode "Love Birds", Glenn tells Amy he never sees his newborn child because he works 16+ hours a day. In the next episode, "Minor Crimes", he demotes himself to floor worker so he can work fewer hours. When Amy takes over as store manager, she soon convinces Glenn to take her old floor supervisor job, which he accepts.

In the season 6 episode "California (Part 2)", Glenn is promoted back to his Store Manager position following Amy's departure to take a corporate job. In the series finale, Glenn decides to reopen Sturgis & Sons, and he hires Mateo and Cheyenne to work with him.

Sandra Kaluiokalani

Portrayed by Kaliko Kauahi, Sandra Kaluiokalani is a Cloud 9 employee of Native Hawaiian descent who has trouble bringing up legitimate concerns and being heard. She often attempts to make her voice heard only to shoot herself down. A running gag in the show often sees Sandra attempting to bring something up, only for Dina to yell "Shut Up, Sandra!" As such, she suffers from low-self esteem and low self-confidence. Sandra follows orders, even if the order is to do something dangerous. Sandra occasionally gets caught between 2 people asking her to do opposite things, not knowing who to listen to.

Sandra has lots of talents, despite her low self-esteem. She revealed herself to be a midwife when Cheyenne had her baby and can play the ukulele very well. She also has superior autobiographical memory in which she can remember every single day of her life. Sandra frequently tells lies to make herself seem less pathetic in front of coworkers. In season 2, Mateo accuses Sandra of being Jeff's lover when the employees feel someone close to him is passing off sensitive information. Rather than deny it, Sandra pretends to be dating Jeff by sending herself gifts (that she says are from him). This comes back to bite her when she’s flirting with a man (Jerry) and Carol stops them, saying Sandra is dating someone. Carol proceeds to flirt with Jerry, leading to a relationship with him, even though he actually likes Sandra. Sandra eventually gets Jerry back however, this causes Sandra to get into a feud with Carol throughout Season 3 and 4. In "Toxic Workplace", Sandra loses a coin flip to Carol and as a result of the wager, Carol gets to be with Jerry. In the episode "Cheyenne's Wedding", Jerry proclaims he loves Sandra, not Carol. The two later make out in Glenn's office while trying to hide their relationship from the vindictive Carol. The two marry in the season 5 episode "Sandra's Wedding” and Carol attempts to murder Sandra’s cat as revenge, which Dina stops her from doing.

In the season 5 episode "California Part 1", Sandra and Jerry adopt Tony, Glenn's 17-year-old foster son. He later begins working at Cloud 9 alongside Sandra. After the store closes in "All Sales Final," Sandra is chosen by Dina to be the assistant manager of the fulfillment center.

Recurring
 Bilbo "Bo" Derek Thompson portrayed by Johnny Pemberton, Cheyenne's immature, wannabe-rapper boyfriend and her baby's father. Bo was previously hit by a car and won a $5,000 settlement, which he plans on using for their wedding. Bo worked at Cloud 9 for one day, which made Cheyenne uncomfortable. As of the episode "Cheyenne's Wedding", he is Cheyenne's husband. 
 Sal Kazlauskas portrayed by Sean Whalen, a creepy, older Cloud 9 employee. It is implied that he harasses Sandra sexually, making comments about her breasts both at work and at her home. His corpse is later discovered sealed inside the store's walls in season 3, having apparently gotten trapped while trying to install a camera to peep into the women's bathroom.
 Tate Stasklewicz portrayed by Josh Lawson, a Cloud 9 pharmacist who is often rude, panicky, sarcastic and full of himself. He often passes his job onto other employees whenever he can.
 Myrtle Vartanian portrayed by Linda Porter, an elderly Cloud 9 employee who is often quite confused and forgetful. It's revealed in the season 3 episode "District Manager" that Myrtle is the highest-paid associate in the store, due to getting small but consistent raises over her 30 years of employment. This prompts new District Manager Laurie to fire Myrtle in a cost-cutting move. In season 4, she appears as a hologram that greets customers, something Jeff gave to the store to try and win back employee approval after he let her get fired. Late that season, new manager Amy rehires Myrtle as her assistant. Myrtle passes away in season 5 (as Porter had died in real life). Episode 12 of this season was dedicated to the character.
 Marcus White portrayed by Jon Barinholtz, an immature, dim-witted Cloud 9 stockroom employee who briefly dates Dina after Jonah rejects her.  He previously went to prison, after his mom turned him in to save herself when they were both caught using illegal drugs. Marcus had his thumb cut off while working the deli slicer. After agreeing not to sue for his thumb being cut off, Marcus was promoted to warehouse supervisor. It's revealed in Season 4 that Marcus is making a six-figure salary due to Glenn making a decimal error when punching in his hourly rate. After the error is corrected, Marcus loses his house and starts living in the store, before moving in with Mateo and later Isaac. He slowly becomes a friend of the main group in the later seasons, particularly Jonah and Garett, and joins Dina in the Zephra fulfillment center in the finale.
 Emma Dubanowski portrayed by Isabella Day, Amy's daughter with her husband (later ex-husband), Adam. Emma celebrates her quinceañera (15th birthday) in season 4.
 Adam Dubanowski portrayed by Ryan Gaul, Amy's ex-husband and Emma's father. Adam and Amy were high school sweethearts, got married at 19, and had Emma thereafter. He's a YouTube personality who makes grilling videos, and has attempted several entrepreneurial enterprises, which always fail. To get extra money, he became a seasonal employee at Cloud 9, which upset Amy.
 Jeff Sutton portrayed by Michael Bunin, District Manager who oversees the St. Louis Cloud 9, among others. He comes out as gay, and has a romantic interest in Mateo. He resigns in Season 3 to keep seeing Mateo, but is rehired for a job in Chicago by the CEO in the Season 3 finale.
Brett Kobashigawa portrayed by Jon Miyahara, a Cloud 9 employee who is stated to have broken every sales and competition record, despite him being depicted as someone who rarely moves or speaks. He was thought to be killed in the tornado that concluded season 2 when he disappeared and did not show up for work at the store's reopening in season 3. It's revealed in "Brett's Dead" that he simply drove home that day, and no one called him about the reopening because they thought he was deceased.
Elias portrayed by Danny Gura, Glenn's brother-in-law and a Cloud 9 employee who is frequently seen in the background. In the final episode, it is revealed he is the source of the recurring severed feet found in the store.
Carol Malloon portrayed by Irene White, a Cloud 9 employee who calls to hit on Adam immediately after hearing about his separation with Amy. She also dates Jerry, a guy that Sandra is interested in, because she thinks Sandra is with Jeff. When Jerry reveals that he likes Sandra, Carol accuses Sandra of stealing him. After Carol's attempt to sabotage Sandra and Jerry's wedding ceremony is thwarted, she disappears for a while. She returns claiming to have found Buddhism and outwardly demonstrating a mellower personality.
Justine Sikowicz portrayed by Kelly Schumann, a Cloud 9 employee who pretends to be a "loose" party girl and have a drinking problem, in order to be popular.
Jerry portrayed by Chris Grace, a man whom Sandra develops crush on in "Ladies Lunch", but can't date because she is in her fake relationship with Jeff. Jerry briefly dates Carol, but chats with Sandra in "Cheyenne's Wedding" and proclaims he is really in love with her. Sandra learns Jerry is in a coma after a tornado hits the area in the Season 2 finale. He does not come out of the coma until the Season 3 episode "Christmas Eve". His confusing dialogue in the Season 3 episode "Golden Globes Party" hints that he may still be suffering from brain damage, although he appears fully recovered in Season 4.
Isaac portrayed by Steve Agee, a very tall, unhealthy, and easily excitable Cloud 9 employee. He is first seen in Season 2's "Seasonal Help" as a temporary worker from Glenn's church's "Last Chances" program giving former drug addicts employment. In "Health Fund", he is seen as a full-time worker who joins Jonah's health fund and believes the health fund should "just" cover everyone, cover everything, exclude no one, and be affordable. After Marcus proposes health tests such as jumping on a table, Isaac jumps on the break room table but hits a fan due to his height and falls into the vending machine, leading to Tate supergluing the glass cuts on his face. In "Amnesty," he is stated to have planned a remake of Bumfights called "Bumfights On Crack" using local St. Louis homeless people. He becomes Marcus's best friend and eventual roommate.
Kelly Watson portrayed by Kelly Stables, a divorcee who begins working at Cloud 9 in Season 3. She soon becomes romantically involved with Jonah. After Jonah's love for Amy becomes known, Kelly transfers to the Fenton Cloud 9 store.
Alex the Beverage Guy, portrayed by Vladimir Caamano, an easygoing Dominican man who works for Cloud 9's beverage vendor. He jokingly threatens to "take away" Amy's "Latina card" as a way of flirting with her. Amy briefly dates him before her pregnancy is revealed by Bo in the middle of the store to Jonah, Alex, and Adam in "Aftermath" (Season 3).
Laurie Neustadt portrayed by Jennifer Irwin, the new district manager who takes over after Jeff resigns in Season 3.
Jerusha Sturgis portrayed by Kerri Kenney-Silver, Glenn's wife and Elias' older sister, who frequently volunteers at their church and enjoys knitting and cross-stitching.
Sayid portrayed by Amir M. Korangy, a Cloud 9 employee who is a former Syrian refugee. He befriends Marcus during Season 5.
Tony portrayed by Benjamin Norris, Glenn's teenage ex-foster son who becomes Sandra's adopted son upon Glenn realizing they were both Hawaiian. He becomes a floor worker in the sixth season episode "Ground Rules" and, while good at his job, disrespects Glenn and Cheyenne.

References

Superstore
Characters